Southeast Area Transit (abbreviated to SEAT) is a provider of local bus service in eight towns and two cities in the southeastern portion of the U.S. state of Connecticut: East Lyme, Griswold, Groton (town and city), Ledyard, Montville, New London, Norwich, Stonington, and Waterford. Under contract to Amtrak, SEAT also provides Thruway Motorcoach service from New London to Foxwoods.

Routes
SEAT operates the following bus routes:

Regional routes. Routes connecting major cities or towns in the region.
1: Norwich to New London via Route 32
2: Norwich to New London via Route 12 and Groton
3: New London to Niantic via Boston Post Road and Crossroads Wal-Mart
108: New London to Foxwoods via Groton and Old Mystic Village (also an Amtrak Thruway Motorcoach route)

Norwich/Jewett City. These routes, except Route 8, originate from the Norwich, Connecticut.
4: Norwich Transit Center to Occum/Taftville
5: Norwich Transit Center to Norwich Business Park via Backus Hospital
6: Norwich Transit Center to Norwich Wal-Mart via Marcus Plaza
7: Norwich Transit Center to Hamilton Avenue, Uncas-on-Thames and Mohegan Sun
8: Lisbon Landing to Jewett City
9: Norwich Transit Center to Lisbon Landing via Route 12
982: Norwich Transit Center to Foxwoods via State Route 2

New London/Groton. These routes, except Route 11, originate from the New London Railroad Station.
11: Groton Local
12: New London to Crystal Mall and NL Shopping Center
13: New London to L&M Hospital and Ocean Beach
14: New London to NL Mall, Waterford Commons, Crystal Mall and NL Shopping Center
15: New London/Waterford Local (nights only)

Mystic/Pawcatuck
Stonington HOP Service: On-demand microtransit service in Stonington

Fares

Children aged 5 and under and measuring 45 inches in height or below ride for free.

Transfers
One free transfer may be obtained with each fare. Transfers allow customers to complete a one way trip which requires multiple buses.  Transfers are issued upon fare payment and are valid for one-and-a-half hours. Transfers cannot be used to make a round trip. Transfers are only accepted at the following designated Transfer Points: 
Norwich Transportation Center, Lisbon Landing, Mohegan Sun, New London Water Street, New London NSA, New London Eugene O’Neill and State Street Shelter, Groton Square, Groton Plaza Court, I-95 / Route 2 Commuter Lot (N. Stonington), Olde Mistick Village

Fleet

References

External links
 SEAT official website

Bus transportation in Connecticut
New London, Connecticut
Transportation in New London County, Connecticut
Norwich, Connecticut
Organizations established in 1975
Transit agencies in Connecticut